Acyphoderes cribricollis is a species of beetle in the family Cerambycidae. It was described by Bates in 1892.

References

Acyphoderes
Beetles described in 1892